San Jose, officially the City of San Jose, is a 3rd class component city in the province of Nueva Ecija, Philippines. According to the 2020 census, it has a population of 150,917 people.

Before the city was founded by the Spanish colonizers, it is known as Kabaritan, named for the plant commonly seen in the area. With its wide plains, agriculture is the main source of livelihood in the city. It is part of the rice granary of the Philippines. Besides rice, the city also produces vegetables, fruits, and onions. It is now a leading producer of onions in the country. Every year the Tanduyong Festival is held in April coinciding with the annual fiesta to celebrate this. Tanduyong is a variety of onion grown in the area.

The city has two pronounced seasons, rainy season from the months of May to November and the dry season in the remaining months.

Etymology
The town got its name after Saint Joseph, the patron saint of the place. 
>

History
San Jose, years before it became a town was a wilderness, a veritable hunting ground for wild animals by the inhabitants of its neighboring towns. The earliest inhabitants were known as Negritos (Baluga) headed by Kapitan Danding, a Negrito convert residing in Pinagcuartelan. These early inhabitants depended mostly on hunting and fishing for their livelihood. Some hunters from the neighboring towns found San Jose as a good place for settlers due to its wide and uncleared agricultural land. The first group of settlers made some clearings (kaingin) in the outskirts of the present town.

Originally, San Jose was a part of the town Puncan, but later on, because of its nearness to Lupao, it was made a barrio of the latter. The early history of this town was coupled with the early history of Puncan and Lupao. Formerly, San Jose was known as the barrio of “Kabaritan” derived from barit, an Ilocano word for a plant that belongs to the rattan family. “Kabaritan” means the place where “barit” grows in abundance.

On March 19, 1894, San Jose carved out its own course for on this date it became a full-fledged town, with an interim government headed by a Kapitan Municipal. “Kabaritan” (now known as San Jose) was made an independent town from Lupao and was named after Saint Joseph, the patron saint of the place.

Several years before the Philippine Revolution, the Ilocanos from Ilocos Region and some parts of Nueva Ecija, especially the towns of Santo Domingo, Muñoz and Lupao, as well as Pangasinenses of Pangasinan and northern Tarlac, came and plunged deep into the forest of Kabaritan, and cleared its wilderness. It was from this time then that the growth of the town really started. The progress of the town was through the enterprise, thrift, and hardihood of these settlers, headed by Canuto Ramos.

During the Spanish Regime, the barrio of Kabaritan was a municipal district of Lupao, headed by a Teniente Absoluto. Later, when Kabaritan was declared a town in 1894, the head was changed to a Kapitan Municipal. The first man appointed as Kapitan Municipal was Canuto Ramos. He served from 1894 to 1898. One of his remarkable achievements was the Construction of an Irrigation System which was later taken over and enlarged by the government (now the Talavera River Irrigation System) which irrigates vast ricefields as far as the towns of Muñoz and Talavera.

American occupation and the Commonwealth of the Philippines 
When the revolution broke out and upon the surrender of the Spaniards in 1898, a revolutionary government was set up in San Jose. The town remained as such until the establishment of a civil government under the Americans in 1901.

San Jose, under the American Regime, became a progressive town. Its inhabitants enjoyed more rights and privileges- political, economic, intellectual and religious than before. This was due to the establishment of various schools, churches, public buildings and the construction of roads and bridges, which made possible the fast progress of the town.

From 1898 to 1900, a military government under the American Regime was established. Jose Cardenas was appointed Kapitan Municipal. During his term, the appointment of town officials, town planning, and the opening of new settlements was among his achievements.

The second appointed Kapitan Municipal during the military government (1900–1901) was Celestino Javalde who continued the opening of new settlements and the construction of roads in the poblacion.

When the civil government under the American Regime was established, Cornelio Ramos was appointed Kapitan Municipal. He continued the construction of roads in the poblacion and he also took a hand in the construction of irrigation canals leading to the different barrios of San Jose.

In 1904, the Filipinos were given more rights and freedom in choosing the right man to take the reins of the government. An election was held. The first elected Municipal President was Crisanto Sanchez (1904–1906). Among his achievements was the construction of roads, the naming of the streets in the poblacion and the appointments of municipal officials.

Again, (1906–1908) Celestino Javalde was elected Municipal President. With the help of his vice-president and other municipal officials, he stressed land reforms, which paved the way for equal distribution of lands.

The President-elect of 1908–1910, Valerio Escobar concentrated on the Construction of Roads from Sibut to San Agustin. He also founded the barrios of Santa Barbara and Kapisungan (now Bagong Sikat).

Desiderio De Guzman had a chance to be elected in 1910 and served up to 1912. He had many achievements but among all these, he paid more attention to the improvements of records in the Poblacion.

During the incumbency of Municipal President Agapito Kurameng, (1912–1916), he initiated the Construction of a Concrete Elementary School Building (Gabaldon building) which now comprised one of the central school buildings of the San Jose West Elementary School. The improvement of roads, expropriation of lots for the Municipal Hall and the Public Market were among his other achievements.

The construction of the Municipal building and the construction of more roads leading to the barrios were launched by Gregorio Cadhit (1916–1919). He was re-elected to office from 1919 to 1922. During his term in 1919 to 1922, he initiated the construction of one of the buildings of the public market.

As years went by, the town became so progressive that there was a need for more public improvements and building constructions for the welfare of the populace. As an answer to such demands, the newly elected President Rafael Rueda and Vice-president Estanislao Arquero with the help of other municipal officials put up a Puericulture Center and a Municipal Nursery during the period from 1922 to 1925. A second building for the public market was also constructed. Telephone lines connecting the poblacion with all the barrios were installed. A road to Kalbarito (now Palestina) was constructed and more improvement of roads was done.

Another man in the person of Raymundo Eugenio was elected Municipal President of San Jose for the period from 1925 to 1928. A third building for the public market was constructed and more construction of roads, especially those leading to Andres Bonifacio, were put underway.

In 1928–1931, Apolonio Pascual and Vice-president Victorino Villar were instrumental in putting up the fourth building for the public market and the municipal dispensary. More improvement of roads leading to the barrios was also done.

Raymundo Eugenio was re-elected to the office. He served from 1931 to 1934 with Vice-president Ladislao Bunag. Raymundo Eugenio was called the road-building President of San Jose because of the untiring efforts that he exerted in the construction of many roads especially roads leading to the barrios of Bagong Bayan, Porais, Tondod, and Andres Bonifacio.

Apolonio Pascual was re-elected for the 1934–1937 term. Dimas Tomas was the Vice President for the same term. Due to a change in the set-up in 1935, which was known as the commonwealth government, the heads of the municipal government came to be known and called Alcalde and Vice-Alcalde. Aside from the construction of more roads, the barrios of Patacla (now San Francisco) and A. Pascual were founded. The waterworks that provides the people of San Jose with drinking water was constructed and installed. The home economics building of San Jose Central School was also constructed.

Alcalde Pedro Del Pilar and Vice-Alcalde Severino Bautista, under the Commonwealth government, established NARIC (National Rice and Corn) buying stations in the town. This was during their term of office from 1937 to 1940. They were re-elected for the 1940–1942 term. As a continuation of their policies, the improvement of roads was continued.

World War II 
The outbreak of World War II was occurred in the country on December 8, 1941. San Jose became an evacuation center for evacuees from neighboring provinces especially those from Manila and suburbs. The tranquility of the place was marred by the bombings of two Japanese planes on December 23, 1941. The terror-stricken populace, who suffered heavy casualties fled to the remotest barrios of San Jose. An emergency government under the Commonwealth was established in the barrio of Porais with Basilio Duran as Mayor, appointed by the military forces of the Commonwealth Government. The emergency government existed for a short time, due to the arrival of the Japanese Imperial Forces on January 26, 1942.

An emergency government, under the control of the Japanese Imperial Forces, was likewise established in Porais with Matias Bautista as Mayor. Due to the non-cooperation of the appointed Mayor Bautista, the Japanese army was obliged to appoint Mayor Anastacio Bascos. Engr. Casimiro Panajon succeeded him. Mayor Panajon was however murdered by the soldiers of the Japanese Garrison of this town for his non-collaboration with them and his guerilla activities.

During the liberation, under the Commonwealth government, Anselmo Patacsil, Pedro Del Pilar and Basilio Duran were appointed in succession as Mayors of this town by the PCAU (Philippine Civil Affairs Unit) of the liberation forces. Each served for a short period of time in 1945–1946. They strived once more for the re-organization of the Municipal Government in cooperation with officials to coordinate the work of the PCAU. These persons helped in the establishment of emergency hospitals, the North Provincial High School and the re-opening of elementary schools.

Contemporary history

Independence of the Philippines from the United States 
On July 4, 1946, the Philippines was granted its independence, there came about a change in our form of government, from Commonwealth to Republic.

Under the Republic of the Philippines, Alfonso Villamar was elected Mayor with Paulino Margarejo as his Vice Mayor, (1947–1951). Among their achievements were the maintenance of evacuees, pacification campaign, rehabilitation of devastated government building, the establishment of a fire department and a municipal library and the improvement of roads.

Creation of Llanera 
In 1954, the barrios of Bagumbayan (townsite), Andres Bonifacio, Caridad, San Mauricio (portion), Parang Manga (portion), Santa Barbara, Floridablanca, Gomez, San Francisco, and Victoria were separated to form the town of Llanera along with some territory from Talavera and Rizal.

Cityhood 

On August 4, 1969, by virtue of Republic Act 6051, San Jose was converted into a city, making it as the third city in Nueva Ecija after Cabanatuan and Palayan.

Geography
San Jose has a tropical wet and dry climate  (Köppen-Geiger system: Aw),The average annual temperature is 26.7 °C in San Jose. Precipitation here averages 1869 mm.  The city of San Jose lies at 15° 47' North, 120° 59' East in Central Luzon. The estimated elevation at these coordinates is approximately 109.9 meters or 360.4 feet above mean sea level.

Climate

Barangays

San Jose City is politically subdivided into 38 barangays.

Demographics

Language

The current population of San Jose City is 129,424 people in 23,191 households as of May 2010. The majority language used is Tagalog, more than 72 percent of the population speak it as their native tongue, followed by Ilocano, Kapampangan, and Pangasinense.

Religion

On February 16, 1984, the Diocese of San Jose was created by Pope John Paul II. The creation of the new diocese bisected the province horizontally into the Diocese of Cabanatuan in the south, and the Diocese of San Jose in the north, both the suffragans of the Archdiocese of Lingayen-Dagupan. 80% of the city residents are Catholics and the patron saint is Saint Joseph. The feast is celebrated every March 19 annually. The diocese now has 17 parishes administered by 22 priests working under one bishop. Among its Catholic institutions are 9 high schools, 4 elementary schools, 6 kindergarten schools, 1 diocesan catechetical center, and the Don Bosco Training Center.

Economy 

Agriculture is the prime revenue of San Jose City since it is a part of the rice granary of the Philippines. However other agri-based produce are vegetables, fruits and onions. The city is now a leading producer of onions in the country.

The city's local crops range from rice, corn, and onion; thus the city is also referred to as the "City of the Golden Harvests" and “Rice Bowl of the Philippines.” Other crops are mango, banana, eggplant, and garlic.

Shopping centers 
San Jose City serves as another shopping hub, besides Cabanatuan, in the province and other nearby localities and provinces like Pangasinan and Nueva Viscaya. Malls like Waltermart and Magic Mall have already established their presence in the city.

In terms of future developments, the Philippines' major mall chain SM has expressed plans to build a mall in the city.

Tourism

Tayabo Nature Park The park is situated at the gateway to the Cagayan Valley, at the foot of Mount Caraballo. It has a hundred step stairs leading to lamp-lit pagodas in the hilltop, and from the park can be seen Nueva Ecija.

Palasapas Falls This waterfall is located in the outskirts of the city, in the barrio Manicla, seven kilometers away from the Poblacion.

Christmas Capital In 2018, the city has been named as the Christmas Capital of Nueva Ecija for its grand Christmas lights.

Festivals

 Tanduyong Festival: San Jose City prides itself as the "Onion Capital of the Philippines" and is a leading producer of onion, garlic, rice and vegetables. Tanduyong is a variety of onion grown in the area. Every year, on the fourth Sunday of April, the people of San Jose celebrate the Tanduyong Festival. On festival day, the streets are filled with contingents of dancers outfitted in striking, multi-hued native costumes. Special activities included are a beauty contest, tourism, and trade fair, awarding ceremony and cultural shows.
 Pagibang Damara: Hundreds of years ago in Central Luzon, landlords in the haciendas made the farmers build the “damara”, just before planting time of palay. A “damara” is a makeshift shelter made from kawayan (bamboo) and nipa, built at the center of ricefields as a protection from the sun's heat or from rain. Over the years, it has been a tradition that after all the harvests were safely brought home, the “damaras” are demolished (“ginigiba”). People then start celebrating together for the bountiful harvest.

In 2008, with rice as its primary produce, San Jose City conducted its First Rice Festival, adopting the century – old festive tradition. However, unlike in older days, wherein people celebrate separately in their barangays, San Jose City now celebrates together. The after-harvest celebration has become a multi-sectoral effort, collectively prepared, funded out of contributions (from the public and private sector), and participated in by all sections of the city.

Since 2015, Pagibang Damara festival features the best Pancit Kanin contest. Pansit Kanin is one of the most common menus among carinderias in San Jose City.

Transportation

Major bus companies from Metro Manila ply the route going to San Jose City along the Pan-Philippine Highway. Baliwag Transit, Inc. has terminal in Pasay and Cubao, Quezon City has buses that travel specifically to and from Nueva Ecija.

Bus Companies going to San Jose City:
 Baliwag Transit Inc. From Cubao/Caloocan
 Saulog Transit from Olongapo City
 Arayat Express from Olongapo City
 Genesis Transport from Mariveles, Bataan/San Fernando City, Pampanga
 Golden Bee Transport and Logitics Corporation from Cubao/Pasay
 Viron Transit from Narvacan, Ilocos Sur

Former PNR Station in San Jose City 

The Philippine National Railways (then Manila Railroad Company) used to have a branch line northwards from Tutuban, Manila and branches out from the mainline in Tarlac City going to San Jose City. The Tarlac-San Jose line, which served the towns of Guimba, Muñoz and San Jose, was initially constructed in the 1920s and was completed in 1939. However, in 1988, during the administration of Corazon Aquino, the North Main Line was closed (see Philippine National Railways). This railway branch line has long been neglected and dismantled since its closure. The concrete ruins of the old MRR station of San Jose City are located along San Roque Street in Barangay Abar 1st.

Education

San Jose City has many private and public schools.

Private schools:
 Bethany Christian Academy
 Bettbien Montessori
 Bascos San Jose School 
 Bettbien High School
 College for Research & Technology- San Jose City Campus
 Core Gateway College
 Hope Of Manitoba Essential Academy (HOME Academy)
 Mount Carmel Montessori Center
 Nieves Center for Education, Inc. -San Jose City
 San Jose Christian Colleges
 School of the Sacred Heart of San Jose City
 St. Joseph School
 Gracious Shepherd Christian Academy
 Keanney-Diaz Educational Institute
 Elim School for Values and Excellence
 Evangelical Christian Academy 
 St. John's Academy
 STI College San Jose City
 St. Augustine Foundation Colleges of Nueva Ecija Inc. San Jose City

Public schools:
 San Jose East Central School
 San Jose West Central School
 Abar Elementary School
 Bagong Sikat Integrated School
 Caanawan National High School
 Caanawan Elementary School
 Calaocan Elementary School
 CLSU Laboratory High School-Pinili
 San Jose City National High School (Formerly CPNHS)
 Constancio Padilla National High School Kita-kita Annex
 Porais National High School
 Porais Elementary School
 Pinili Elementary School
 San Agustin Integrated School
 Santo Tomas Elementary School
 Santo Niño 3rd High School
 Tayabo Elementary School
 Tayabo High School - CPNHS Annex
 Tondod High School

References

External links

 
 [ Philippine Standard Geographic Code]
 Philippine Census Information
 Local Governance Performance Management System

 
Cities in Nueva Ecija
Populated places established in 1894
1894 establishments in the Philippines
Component cities in the Philippines